This is a graphical lifespan timeline of prime ministers of Romania.  The prime ministers are listed in order of office.

<div style="overflow:auto">

See also
List of heads of government of Romania
Prime Minister of Romania
Government of Romania

External links
 Guvernele României
Government site

Romania, List of Prime Ministers of

Prime Ministers
Graphical timelines